The Longyou Caves, also called the Xiaonanhai Stone Chambers, are a group of 24 artificial sandstone caverns located at Fenghuang Hill, near the village of Shiyan Beicun on the Qu River in Longyou County, Quzhou prefecture, Zhejiang province, China. Created more than 2,000 years ago, they were not recorded in any historical documents and were rediscovered by farmers in 1992.

Discovery 
In June 1992, four farmers in Longyou found the caves when they drained the water of five small ponds in their village. The ponds turned out to be five large manmade caverns. Further investigation revealed 19 more caverns nearby. They have been determined to be more than 2000 years old and their construction is not recorded in any historical documents.

About  to the northwest, the Huashan Grottoes at the riverbanks of the Xin'an River somewhat resemble the Longyou Caves but are likely to have been built more than 1,500 years later during the late Ming Dynasty (1552–1667 AD).

Description 
The caves are notable in several respects
 They have maintained their structural integrity and do not interconnect with each other.

References 

Caves of Zhejiang
Archaeology of China
History of Zhejiang
Buildings and structures in Zhejiang
1992 archaeological discoveries
Tourist attractions in Quzhou